Naval Detachment K was a Finnish military detachment—specifically, a flotilla that operated on Lake Ladoga during World War II.

Background

The Continuation War began in the summer of 1941. The Finns, who had operated naval units on Lake Ladoga before World War II, began reestablishing a flotilla on the lake as soon as their troops reached its shores early on in the war. The headquarters was formed in Läskelä on 2 August 1941 and by 6 August, 150 motorboats, two tugs (used as minelayers) and four steam ferries had been transferred there. The tugs and ferries were equipped with 47 mm guns and machine guns. The Finns also established a number of coastal batteries on the shores and islands of Lake Ladoga. The only "true" Finnish warship on Lake Ladoga at that time was the obsolete ex-motor torpedo boat Sisu. As the Finnish land forces advanced, new headquarters were established in the captured towns along the shores of Ladoga. The Ladoga flotilla's headquarters was eventually moved to Sortavala and the harbour at Lahdenpohja became its primary base of operations.

Formation

Already during the spring Finnish Lieutenant General Paavo Talvela and Colonel Järvinen who was commanding the Laatokka Coastal Brigade came up with an idea that the boat traffic providing supplies to the Leningrad needed to be disrupted. Talvela then presented this idea to the Germans on his own behalf going past both Finnish Navy HQ and General HQ. Germans responded positively to the proposition and informed the slightly surprised Finns—who apart from Talvela had very little knowledge of the proposition—that transport of the equipment for the Ladoga operation was already arranged. Both the Germans and Italians sent naval units to Lake Ladoga to assist the Finns with coastal defence of the lake and to enforce the ongoing siege of Leningrad.

A combined Finnish-German-Italian unit, the Laivasto-osasto K (LOs.K., Naval Detachment K) was formed on 17 May 1942, consisting of the four Italian MAS boats, four German KM minelayers and the Finnish motor torpedo boat Sisu. The German and Italian vessels were grouped into two units under Finnish command. First to arrive was the Italian unit XII Squadriglia MAS on 22 June, consisting of four MAS torpedo boats (MAS 526, 527, 528, and 529). Five days later, four German KM-minelayers also arrived. However, the German minelayers suffered from inexperienced crews and unreliable engines and it took until 10 August before all German boats were repaired and deemed operational.

Also operating on the lake were the Finnish Ladoga Naval Detachment, composed mainly of fishing vessels and small motor boats,  and the German Eastern Ferry Unit, a Luftwaffe formation of armed Siebel ferries.

Operations

Naval Detachment K's primary task was harassing Soviet supply lines to Leningrad on southern Ladoga, where both Soviet and Allied produced food and munitions were delivered to the besieged residents of Leningrad. The unit also staged attacks on enemy bases and conducted limited landing operations on the shores of Lake Ladoga. Some smaller Soviet patrol boats and several barges delivering food to besieged Leningrad were attacked and sunk during 1942 and 1943. EFO also undertook offensive operations on the lake, such as the assault on Sukho island, but this was unsuccessful. The Finnish Ladoga Flotilla also had clashed with the Soviet Ladoga Flotilla, and operated in Lake Ladoga from June 25, 1941, through November 4, 1944.

Analysis
The operations of the international flotilla were a failure. Torpedoes proved useless in the shallow waters of southern Lake Ladoga, where they frequently struck the bottom. Nor did their magnetic detonators work well against the wooden hulls of Soviet barges and patrol boats. The secondary armament of the MTBs also proved too light to seriously threaten Soviet gunboats. German mineboats turned out to have extremely unreliable engines, keeping them docked in port far longer than they spent on actual operations nor were their influence mines especially useful against mainly wooden hulled Soviet vessels.

Dissolving the detachment

Naval Detachment K was dissolved in the winter of 1942/43. The Italian torpedo vessels were relocated from Lake Ladoga to Tallinn at the end of October 1942 and would eventually be absorbed into the Finnish Navy. Likewise, the Germans withdrew most of their vessels, leaving two ferries and four infantry boats which Finns had bought. In January 1943, the Soviet Red Army launched Operation Spark, to open up a land connection to Leningrad and break the siege. Axis forces were pushed back 80 km and the Road of Life no longer had its previous significance. Neither German nor Italian units returned to Lake Ladoga, although smaller Finnish units continued to operate in the lake against the Soviets during 1943 and 1944.

References

Bibliography
 Балтийский Флот. Гречанюк Н. М., Дмитриев В. И., Корниенко А. И. и др., М., Воениздат. 1990.
 Der Zweite Weltkrieg. Raymond Cartier. 1977, R. Piper & CO. Verlag, Munchen / Zurich; 1141 pages.
 Siege of Leningrad and Finland 1941–1944. By Dr. Nikolai Baryshnikov. Russian: "Блокада Ленинграда и Финляндия 1941–44" Институт Йохана Бекмана. 2003.

External links
  Luftwaffen-Fährenflotillen
 War on Lake Ladoga 1941–1944

Finnish Navy
Finland–Soviet Union relations
Battles and operations of the Continuation War
Military units and formations of Italy in World War II
1942 in Finland